Josef Milnarik (2 August 1903 – 30 November 1969) was an Austrian footballer. He played in one match for the Austria national football team in 1924.

References

External links
 

1903 births
1969 deaths
Austrian footballers
Austria international footballers
Place of birth missing
Association footballers not categorized by position